The Roman Catholic Diocese of Oudtshoorn is a diocese located in the city of Oudtshoorn in the Ecclesiastical province of Cape Town in South Africa.

On 4 May 2020, Noel Andrew Rucastle, a priest of the Archdiocese of Cape Town, was appointed Bishop of Oudtshoorn.

History
 3 August 1874: Established as Apostolic Prefecture of Cape of Good Hope, Central District from the Apostolic Vicariate of Cape of Good Hope, Western District
 13 June 1939: Renamed as Apostolic Prefecture of Oudtshoorn
 9 December 1948: Promoted as Apostolic Vicariate of Oudtshoorn
 11 January 1951: Promoted as Diocese of Oudtshoorn

Special churches
 The cathedral is St. Saviour's Cathedral in Oudtshoorn.

Leadership
 Prefects Apostolic of Cape of Good Hope, Central District (Latin Church)
 Bishop Francis Hennemann (1922.06.26 – 1933.06.30), appointed Vicar Apostolic of Cape of Good Hope, Western District
 Fr. Teodoro Koenig (1934.01.12 – 1939.06.13 see below)
 Prefect Apostolic of Oudtshoorn
 Fr. Teodoro Koenig (see above 1939.06.13 – 1947)
 Vicar Apostolic of Oudtshoorn
 Bishop Bruno-Augustin Hippel (1948.12.09 – 1951.01.11 see below)
 Bishops of Oudtshoorn
 Bishop Bruno-Augustin Hippel (see above 1951.01.11 – 1968.10.02)
 Bishop Manfred Gottschalk, S.A.C. (1969.03.06 – 1982.04.20)
 Bishop Edward Robert Adams (1983.05.02 - 2010.05.28) 
 Bishop Francisco Fortunato de Gouveia (appointed 2010.05.28 - retired 2 July 2018)
 Bishop Noel Andrew Rucastle (appointed 4 May 2020 - )

See also
Roman Catholicism in South Africa

Sources
Website (Diocese of Oudtshoorn)
 GCatholic.org
 Catholic Hierarchy

Roman Catholic dioceses in South Africa
Religious organizations established in 1874
Roman Catholic dioceses and prelatures established in the 19th century
1874 establishments in the Cape Colony
Roman Catholic Ecclesiastical Province of Cape Town